Kaliua is a town in Tabora Region in western Tanzania.

Transport 

It lies on the Central Railway of Tanzania, at the junction of a branch line opened in 1949 to Mpanda.

References 

Populated places in Tabora Region